Shine, Shine, My Star is a 1970 comedy-drama film directed by Alexander Mitta.

Plot
Events in the film take place during the Russian Civil War. In a small provincial town at first come to power the red, then the white and then the green. The protagonist is the self-taught theater director Vladimir Iskremas (a pseudonym, which is an abbreviation of "Iskusstvo — revoljucionnym massam" – "Art - for the revolutionary masses") stages the tragedy of Joan of Arc. He is obsessed with the ideas of theater and its transformation under the new revolutionary art.

Cast
Oleg Tabakov as Vladimir Iskremas
Elena Proklova as Christina Kotlyarenko (The Rat)
Yevgeny Leonov as Pashka, the host of the illusion
Oleg Yefremov as Fyodor, artist-autodidact
Vladimir Naumov as Staff Captain
Leonid Dyachkov as Ohrim
Leonid Kuravlyov as Commissioner Serdyuk
Marlen Khutsiev as Prince
Konstantin Voinov as white officer
Boris Boldyrevsky
Alexander Milyutin as guard
Aleksandr Porokhovshchikov as white officer
Lyubov Sokolova as wife of Fyodor
Aleksandr Filippenko as white officer
Anatoly Eliseev as Vakhromeev, murderer of Fyodor
Tatyana Nepomnyashchaya as Margarita Vlasevna, dancer
Lyudmila Khmelnitskaya as Anyuta, a tall dancer
Irina Murzaeva as Tapera
Pavel Vinnik as husband in the silent cinema
Mikaela Drozdovskaya as wife of the staff captain
Nonna Mordyukova as Madame
Rogvold Sukhoverko as assistant of Ohrim (not in the credits)

Production
At first Rolan Bykov was supposed to play Iskremas. But after he starred in the prohibited 1967 film Commissar, the actor was listed as "disgraced" and Oleg Tabakov was hired for the role instead. The working title of the picture, Comedy about Iskremas, was not accepted by the commission at acceptance of the picture. Mitta came up with the new name Shine, Shine, My Star - coinciding with the famous romance. In the episodic roles of white officers in the film three notable Soviet film directors were cast: Vladimir Naumov, Marlen Khutsiev and Konstantin Voinov.

References

External links
 
 

Soviet comedy-drama films
Films directed by Alexander Mitta
1970 comedy-drama films
1970 films
Mosfilm films